Andreas Letz (born 5 June 1962 in Sömmerda, Bezirk Erfurt) is a German weightlifter. He competed in the 56 kg and 60 kg categories, and set two world records in the clean and jerk, and one in the total.

Competing for the German Democratic Republic, he ranked fourth in the 56 kg category at the 1980 Summer Olympics.

Letz ranked overall second at the 1981 World Weightlifting Championships, and ranked third in World Championships three times in 1983, 1985, and 1986. In European Championships, he ranked overall second in 1980 and 1981, and third in 1983, 1985, and 1986.

Notes and references 

1962 births
Living people
People from Sömmerda
People from Bezirk Erfurt
German male weightlifters
Sportspeople from Thuringia
Olympic weightlifters of East Germany
Weightlifters at the 1980 Summer Olympics
World record setters in weightlifting
20th-century German people